Arne Johansen (3 April 1927 – 25 October 2013) was a Norwegian speed skater and Olympic medalist. He received a bronze medal at the 1952 Winter Olympics in Oslo, shared with Gordon Audley from Canada.

References

External links 
 

1927 births
2013 deaths
Norwegian male speed skaters
Olympic speed skaters of Norway
Speed skaters at the 1952 Winter Olympics
Olympic bronze medalists for Norway
Olympic medalists in speed skating
Medalists at the 1952 Winter Olympics
Sportspeople from Oslo